The 2020 Italian Grand Prix (officially known as the Formula 1 Gran Premio Heineken d'Italia 2020) was a Formula One motor race that was held on 6 September 2020 at the Autodromo Nazionale di Monza in Monza, Italy. The race was the eighth round in the 2020 Formula One World Championship.

The race was won by Pierre Gasly of AlphaTauri-Honda, who took his first Formula One win and became the first French Formula One driver to win a race since Olivier Panis won the 1996 Monaco Grand Prix. Gasly started the race in tenth, but gained positions due to a well-timed pit-stop prior to a safety car, sent to retrieve the broken car of Kevin Magnussen. Lewis Hamilton, who led the race until this point, was given a penalty for entering the pit lane when it was closed, passing the lead to Gasly, who defended from McLaren's Carlos Sainz Jr. in the closing stages of the race. Racing Point's Lance Stroll completed the podium.

This was the first race since the 2012 Hungarian Grand Prix to not have a Red Bull, Mercedes, or Ferrari driver on the podium, the first of those podiums to feature three different teams since the 2012 Canadian Grand Prix and the first to feature a red flag since the 2017 Azerbaijan Grand Prix. It was also the first race not to be won by a driver from Red Bull, Mercedes, or Ferrari since the 2013 Australian Grand Prix. Lance Stroll also scored his first podium since the 2017 Azerbaijan Grand Prix.
It was the first instance of there being two standing starts since the 2001 Belgian Grand Prix, following a 2018 change in the regulations to allow for standing restarts after a red flag. This race was the last for both Claire Williams and Frank Williams, as they stepped down from their positions at Williams Racing.

Background

Impact of the COVID-19 pandemic

The opening rounds of the  championship were heavily affected by the COVID-19 pandemic. Several Grands Prix were cancelled or postponed after the planned opening round in Australia was called off two days before the race was due to take place; prompting the Fédération Internationale de l'Automobile to draft a new calendar. However, the Italian Grand Prix was not impacted by this change and kept its original date.

Entrants

The drivers and teams were the same as the season entry list with no additional stand-in drivers for the race. Roy Nissany drove for Williams in the first practice session, replacing George Russell.

Tyres 

Pirelli brought the C2, C3 and C4 tyres for the race weekend, the second, third, and fourth hardest tyre compounds available.

Regulation changes 
Prior to the race, the governing body, the Fédération Internationale de l'Automobile, issued a technical directive banning qualifying-specific engine modes from the Italian Grand Prix onwards. The ban was initially planned for the 2020 Belgian Grand Prix but it was delayed by one race.

Practice 
The first practice session was interrupted briefly when Max Verstappen crashed at the Ascari chicane. The session ended with Valtteri Bottas fastest ahead of Mercedes teammate Lewis Hamilton and Red Bull driver Alexander Albon third fastest. The second practice session ran without major incidents and concluded with Hamilton fastest, followed by Bottas and Lando Norris of McLaren.

Bottas was again fastest in third practice, followed by Carlos Sainz Jr. of McLaren and his teammate Norris. The session was briefly red flagged after Daniel Ricciardo stopped his Renault R.S.20 due to a mechanical failure.

Qualifying

Qualifying report 
Lewis Hamilton took pole, 0.069s ahead of Mercedes teammate Valtteri Bottas. It beat the lap record set by Kimi Räikkönen in 2018 by two tenths of a second. The final part of Q1 was marked by numerous cars starting their final flying lap at close distance, hampering each other's performance.

Qualifying classification

Race

Race report 
Lewis Hamilton successfully retained the lead position on the start, while his teammate Valtteri Bottas gradually dropped to sixth place over the first two laps while reporting problems with his car. Carlos Sainz pulled away quickly to take Valtteri Bottas off the start claiming second. The McLaren driver went on to pull a gap to the cars behind. During lap six the left-rear brake on Sebastian Vettel's SF1000 overheated to the point that the brake assembly caught fire before disintegrating and flying off the car at the start of lap seven. This caused Vettel to miss a couple of corners (in the process he smashed through the polystyrene chicane direction indicator boxes at the first chicane) before limping to the pits to retire.

On lap 18, Kevin Magnussen's Haas suffered a power unit failure and his car stranded to the side of the pit lane entrance. At the end of the next lap, Pierre Gasly elected to make his pitstop. The safety car was deployed shortly afterwards and the pit lane was closed to allow marshals to safely remove the stranded Haas from the track. Both Hamilton and Antonio Giovinazzi made a pit stop shortly after the safety car had been deployed despite the pit lane being closed. They were both given 10-second stop-and-go penalties for this infraction (Hamilton was given two penalty points on his FIA Super Licence as a result). When the pit lane was re-opened two laps later, most of the field entered to make their pit stop. This allowed Gasly to move into third place behind Hamilton and Lance Stroll, the only driver who did not stop.

The safety car was withdrawn at the end of the next lap, allowing normal race conditions to resume on lap 23. Hamilton held on to the lead ahead of Stroll and Gasly. Charles Leclerc crashed heavily after the restart in the Parabolica corner as the car lost its rear end, entered the gravel trap and collided with the barrier, significantly damaging the tyre barriers and his car in the process. Leclerc experienced some pain in his back following the incident, but a medical examination showed he did not have any injuries. The safety car was deployed initially, but the red flags were brought out shortly afterwards to suspend the race to allow repairs to be made to the tyre barriers.

The race resumed later with a standing restart on lap 28. Stroll went wide at turn four dropping to fifth place in the process, with Gasly inheriting second place. Hamilton served his stop-and-go penalty at the end of the lap while Giovinazzi served his one lap later dropping them to the back of the field. This allowed Gasly to take the lead of the race ahead of Kimi Räikkönen and Carlos Sainz Jr. Over the next 25 laps Gasly held off Räikkönen, who gradually fell back to an eventual 13th-place finish, and Sainz to secure victory. Stroll meanwhile fought back to third place to complete the podium.

Gasly took his first Formula One victory and gave AlphaTauri their first win as a constructor and second win as a team, over 12 years since Vettel won the 2008 Italian Grand Prix when the team was known as Toro Rosso. Gasly's victory was the first for a French driver in Formula One since Olivier Panis at the 1996 Monaco Grand Prix, and the 80th F1 World Championship race win for a French driver overall. The win also made Honda the first engine manufacturer to win with two different teams in the sport's V6 turbo-hybrid era.

The result marked the first time that Ferrari, Mercedes and Red Bull all failed to score a podium finish since the 2012 Hungarian Grand Prix. It was also the first time since Räikkönen won the 2013 Australian Grand Prix driving for Lotus F1 that the race winner did not drive for Ferrari, Mercedes or Red Bull. The race contributed to discussions over potential future changes to Formula One race weekend formats.

As Claire and Frank Williams ceased their involvement with the Williams team after this Grand Prix, tributes were paid to the pair from around the paddock, including from George Russell and Nicholas Latifi, the Williams drivers, as they crossed the line.

Race classification 

 Notes
  – Includes one point for fastest lap.

Championship standings after the race

Drivers' Championship standings

Constructors' Championship standings

 Note: Only the top five positions are included for both sets of standings.

See also 
 2020 Monza Formula 2 round
 2020 Monza Formula 3 round

Notes

References

External links 

Italian
Italian Grand Prix
2020
Italian Grand Prix